Bridelia exaltata, known as the brush ironbark or scrub ironbark, is a tree of eastern Australia. It occurs in and on the margins of the drier rainforests. Also occurring by streams, often in association with the Black Bean, up to an elevation of 600 metres above sea level. It occurs from Seal Rocks, New South Wales to Maryborough, Queensland.

The generic name honours Samuel Elisée Bridel-Brideri, an expert on mosses. exaltata refers to the height of the tallest trees.

Description
A medium-sized tree, occasionally as tall as 35 metres and with a stem diameter of 90 cm. The trunk is cylindrical, not buttressed at the base.

Bark is greyish brown. Rough and hard, but with some corky flakes. It can resemble the trunk of the Grey Persimmon. Small branches green or brown without hairs, but with wrinkles and lenticels.

Leaves
Leaves are alternate on the stem, simple in form with smooth entire edges. Leaves elliptic or narrow elliptical in shape, 5 to 12 cm long, 2 to 5 cm wide with a blunt tip. Leaves round at the base, glossy green above, and a duller grey-green and hairy below. Leaf veins seen on both surfaces, raised underneath. Around 15 pairs of lateral leaf veins, at an angle of 60 degrees to the midrib. Leaf stalks hairy, 3 to 5 mm long, purple or green. Leaves are thought to be poisonous to cattle.

Flowers and fruit
Yellowish green flowers form in July. Male and female flowers separate, but often on the same tree. The fruit is a glossy drupe. 1 cm in diameter. Orange brown in colour with small green or yellow spots. Inside is a two celled "stone" 8 mm in diameter. Usually one seed in each cell. Fruit ripe from March to July, eaten by a variety of birds.

References

 
 

exaltata
Flora of New South Wales
Flora of Queensland
Trees of Australia
Taxa named by Ferdinand von Mueller